Tene is a small town and commune in the Cercle of San in the Ségou Region of Mali. As of 2015 the commune had a population of 25337.

References

Tene is a beaufifull small town of 6000 people(2015) between San and Mopti.Tene is a major commercial center in Segou region due to it strategic location. Market day takes place on Saturdays.  Some common family names include Daou,Kone, Diarra, Thera.  The first Peace Corps volunteer, Dan Bellrichard,  Modibo Daou, came to Mali in November 2001.  
The town has a very dynamic Community Health center and a school that is overcrowded. Mousa Daou ,elected in 2009 is the mayor of the commune. The major concern of the population of Tene is the lack of electricity.

Communes of Ségou Region